The 2013–14 VCU Rams men's basketball team represented Virginia Commonwealth University during the 2013–14 NCAA Division I men's basketball season. It was the 46th season of the University fielding a men's basketball program. Led by fifth-year head coach Shaka Smart, they played their home games at the Stuart C. Siegel Center. It was the second season for the Rams playing in the Atlantic 10 Conference. They finished the season 26–9, 12–4 in A-10 play to finish in second place. They advanced to the championship game of the A-10 tournament where they lost to Saint Joseph's. They received an at-large bid to the NCAA tournament where they lost in the second round to Stephen F. Austin.

2013–14 incoming team members

2013–14 team recruits

Roster

Rankings

Schedule 

|-
!colspan=9 style="background:#000000; color:#F8B800;"| Exhibition

|-
!colspan=9 style="background:#000000; color:#F8B800;"| Non-conference regular season

|-
!colspan=9 style="background:#000000; color:#F8B800;"| Conference regular season

|-
!colspan=9 style="background:#000000; color:#F8B800;"| Atlantic 10 tournament

|-
!colspan=9 style="background:#000000; color:#F8B800;"| NCAA tournament

References 

VCU
VCU Rams men's basketball seasons
VCU
VCU Rams
VCU Rams